For information on all University of Minnesota sports, see Minnesota Golden Gophers

The Minnesota Golden Gophers baseball team is the varsity intercollegiate athletic team of the University of Minnesota in Minneapolis, Minnesota, United States. The team competes in the National Collegiate Athletic Association's Division I and are members of the Big Ten Conference.

Home stadiums

Siebert Field

Siebert Field is the home baseball park for the Golden Gophers. The Old Siebert Field hosted its first game on April 23, 1971 – a 2–1 Gopher victory over Creighton. On June 11, 2012, Old Siebert Field was demolished to begin construction on the new Seibert Field. The new Siebert Field hosted its first game on April 5, 2013, which the Gophers won 7–0 over Ohio State.

U.S. Bank Stadium

U.S. Bank Stadium is the alternate stadium for the Golden Gophers.  Opened in 2017 for baseball use, it is primarily used for February and March games, including non-conference home games including a major pre-conference season tournament featuring top teams from major conferences. Like its predecessor, the Hubert H. Humphrey Metrodome, on the same site, the indoor venue allowed the team to play home games when most cold-weather teams had to play road games, and allows for additional home games for the team, a huge advantage in the Big Ten conference.  Roughly 40% of home games are played at U. S. Bank Stadium.

Year-by-year results

Individual awards

All Americans

1952
Gene Elder, 2B
Paul Giel, P

1953
Paul Giel, P

1954
Paul Giel, P

1956
Jerry Kindall, SS
Jerry Thomas, P

1958
Jack McCartan, OF

1959
Ron Causton, OF

1960
Larry Bertelsen, P
Wayne Knapp, P

1961
Larry Bertelsen, P
Wayne Knapp, P

1963
Jon Andresen

1964
Ron Wojciak, C

1967
Dennis Zacho, 1B

1969
Noel Jenke, OF
Mike Walseth, 1B

1973
Dave Winfield, P

1976
Paul Molitor, SS

1977
Paul Molitor, SS
Dan Morgan, P

1982
Greg Olson, C

1990
Brian Raabe, 2B
Dan Wilson, C

1991
Brent Gates, SS

1992
Mark Merila, 2B

1993
Mark Merila, 2B

1994
Mark Merila, 2B

1995
Shane Gunderson, C

1998
Robb Quinlan, 1B

1999
Robb Quinlan, 1B

2001
Jack Hanahan, OF

2002
Luke Appert, 2B

2003
Luke Appert, 2B
Glen Perkins, P

2004
Glen Perkins, P

2009
Derek McCallum, 2B

College World Series

College World Series Most Outstanding Player Award
Jerry Thomas, P, 1956
John Erickson, 2B – 1960
Dave Winfield, OF/P – 1973

All College World Series

1960
John Erickson, 2B
Carl Rolloff, 3B
Dave Pflepsen, SS
Bob Wasko, P

1964
Bill Davis, 1B
Dewey Markus, 2B
Dan Hoffman, OF
Ron Wojciak, C
Joe Pollack, P

1973
Dave Winfield, P

Conference Awards

Big Ten Player of the Year
Terry Steinbach – 1983
Brent Gates, SS – 1991
Mark Merila, 2B – 1994
Shane Gunderson, P – 1995
Robb Quinlan, 1B – 1999
Jack Hannahan, 3B – 2001
Luke Appert, 2B – 2002, 2003
Matt Fiedler, P/OF - 2016

Big Ten Coach of the Year
John Anderson – 1982, 2000, 2002, 2003, 2004, 2010, 2016

Big Ten Pitcher of the Year
C.J. Woodrow – 2002
Glen Perkins – 2004

Big Ten Freshman of the Year
Dan Wilson, C – 1998
Mark Merila, 2B – 1991
Glen Perkins, P – 2003

Big Ten Tournament Most Valuable Player
Terry Steinbach, C – 1982
Jon Beckman, OF – 1985
Tim McIntosh, OF – 1986
Vince Palyan, OF – 1988
Scott Bakkum, P – 1992
Shane Gunderson, P – 1995
Mark Groebner, OF – 1998
Jack Hannahan, 3B – 2001
Glen Perkins, P – 2004
Kyle Knudson, C – 2010

Current and former major league players

Frank Brosseau
Jim Brower
Fred Bruckbauer
J.T. Bruett
Ralph Capron
Steve Comer
Bill Davis
Cole De Vries
Brian Denman
Heinie Elder
Harry Elliott
Bobby Fenwick
Brent Gates
John Gaub
Paul Giel
Jack Hannahan
Bryan Hickerson
Jerry Kindall
Kerry Ligtenberg
Tim McIntosh
Ben Meyer
Paul Molitor
Denny Neagle
Greg Olson
Glen Perkins
Robb Quinlan
Brian Raabe
Mike Sadek
Jeff Schmidt
Terry Steinbach
George Thomas
Jerry Ujdur
Terrin Vavra
Dan Wilson
Dave Winfield

Source: Baseball Reference

References

External links